Leize is a widespread hydronymic root meaning 'pit','ravine'. It appears in modern Basque dictionaries as leze 'cave'.

It may be found at the origin of river or place names as:

Rivers and valleys
the Leitzaran (from Leize Haran 'valley of the Leize'), a river from Leitza in Navarre
the Léez, a left tributary of the Adour
the Léès, a right tributary of the Léez
 the Néez, a tributary of the Gave de Pau, in Gascony
 the Néez, another tributary of the Gave de Pau, in Gascony
the Leze, a river flowing through a cave in Araia
the Lèze, a left tributary of the Ariège
the Lèze and the Lezà, two small tributaries of the Baïse de Lasseube
the Lez (river), a coastal river in Hérault
the Lez (Salat), a left tributary of the Salat (Ariège)
the Lez (Rhône), a left tributary of the Rhône
the Leza,
the Lezo, in La Rioja, Spain
the Lizonne or Nizonne, a tributary of the Dronne (Dordogne basin)
the Lizou, a tributary of the Arcis (Adour basin)
the Lis or Lys, a left tributary of the Échez (Adour basin)
the Lis or Lys, a right tributary of the Bouès (Adour basin)
the Lis Circus where the ski resort of Cauterets is located.
the Lis Valley near Luchon in the Pyrenees.
the Lys, a left tributary of the Layon (Anjou).

The Pyrenean hydronym Neste is related.

On the other hand, the Lys or Leie is based on another root, the Gaulish word liga 'silt'.

Municipalities 

 Lées-Athas, commune of the Aspe Valley (Pyrénées-Atlantiques)
 Les, municipality of the Val d'Aran.
 Lez, commune of Haute-Garonne
 Lez, former commune of Aveyron, today integrated into Taussac
 Lez, village of the commune of Saint-Béat in Haute-Garonne.
 Lys, commune of Pyrénées-Atlantiques
 Saint-Lys (ex Saint-Nicolas de Lys), commune in the southwest of Toulouse.
 Leizpartz, a hamlet of Saint-Étienne-de-Baïgorry

Antroponyms 
 Lexeia, an antic Aquitanian female name

Place name element etymologies
Hydronymy
Prefixes